Scald is common disease of barley in temperate regions. It is caused by the fungus Rhynchosporium commune and can cause significant yield losses in cooler, wet seasons.

Symptoms 

Scald is a foliar disease of barley affecting the leaves and sheaths of the plant; however, lesions may also occur on
coleoptiles, glumes, floral bracts and awns.  Initial symptoms are oval, water-soaked, grayish-green spots, 1.0-1.5 cm long.
As the disease develops, the centers of the lesions dry and bleach, becoming light gray, tan, or white with a dark brown
margin. The lesions are not delimited by the leaf veins and often coalesce.

Disease cycle 

The fungus can infect and survive in barley seed. It exists as mycelium in the pericarp and hull of infected seeds.
Infection of the coleoptile occurs as it emerges from the embryo. Optimal infections occur at soil temperatures of 16C.  At
soil temperatures of 22C or higher, very little infection occurs.

In spring cropping systems, the fungus overwinters on the crop debris and stubble of previous diseased barley crops.   The
fungus produces abundant conidia on wet lesions during cool, damp weather after the leaf tissue has become necrotic. Conidia,
spread by wind and splashing rain, infect young leaves of spring- planted grain. Optimum temperatures for sporulation and
infection range from 10-18C. Hot, dry weather reduces the rate of disease development.

Geographical distribution and economic importance 

The disease is economically important in Europe, North America and Australia.  It has been reported from South
America, Africa, the Middle east, Japan and Korea.  Yield losses as high as 35-40% have been reported, however, losses of
1-10% are more common.  Yield loss is primarily due to reduced kernel weight, but both kernels per head and number of heads
per plant may also been affected.

In the wetter areas of the United Kingdom, scald is the most damaging disease of barley, affecting both spring and winter
crops.
In the Victoria area of Australia, scald is widespread in barley crops in most seasons, but its severity varies greatly from
crop to crop and between seasons. In Victoria, scald causes annual average yield losses of 10-20%, with individual losses as
high as 45% in susceptible varieties. In Canada, yield losses in
Alberta have been calculated at 2.4 per cent, although losses in particular fields may exceed 25 per cent. Losses are due to a
decrease in photosynthetic area on the flag and second leaves resulting in reduced seed weight.

Management 

Management of the disease involves the use of clean and/or treated seeds, resistant cultivars, crop rotation, residue
management, and foliar fungicides.

Resistant cultivars 

Cultivars with scald resistance are available in all major barley growing areas.  The level of resistance occurs along a
spectrum and the degree of resistance that is required to effectively control the disease will depend on the region where it
is grown, cropping practices that reduce initial disease inoculum, wetter conditions and fungal pathotypes.

Fungicides 

Foliar fungicides can be used to effectively control disease development.  Product selection, application rates and timing,
depend upon numerous factors.

The availability of fungicides as a management tool depends on whether the product has been evaluated and registered for use
in a specific country or region.

Foliar fungicides: azoxystrobin1, bromuconazole1, cyproconazole1, epoxiconazole1,
fluquinconazole1, flusilazole1, propiconazole1, 2, 3, prochloraz1,
pyraclostrobin2, tebuconazole1

Seed treatment fungicides: triadimenol2

1. Registered for use in Europe.
2. Registered for use in Canada.
3. Registered for use in the US.

Fungicide resistance 

In the United Kingdom, there are issues concerning MBC fungicides and some of the triazole fungicides (e.g. flusilazole and
epoxiconazole). To date there are no issues with strobilurin fungicides (QoI fungicides), but the situation is being monitored
closely.  There are currently no issues concerning chlorothalonil, cyprodinil or the morpholines.

References 

Fungal plant pathogens and diseases
Barley diseases